The 2019–20 I-League (Officially known as Hero I-League, due to sponsorship reasons) was the 13th season of the I-League, one of the top Indian professional football leagues, since its establishment in 2007. A total of 11 teams competed in the league.

Chennai City were the defending champions, having won the previous season. TRAU F.C. joined as a promoted club from the I-League 2nd Division. Shillong Lajong F.C. were relegated from the I-League last season and will play in the second division in the 2019–20 season. 2017-18 champion Minerva Punjab played as Punjab F.C. from this season as the club was renamed on 30 October 2019.

On 18 April 2020, All India Football Federation, the organising body of the league announced Mohun Bagan A.C. as champions and decided to cancel the remaining matches due to the COVID-19 pandemic. No team was relegated, and the remaining prize money (apart from the champion's prize money) was equally divided among the 10 teams.

Changes from last season

Promoted clubs 
Promoted from the 2018–19 I-League 2nd Division
 TRAU

Relegated clubs 
Relegated from the 2018–19 I-League
 Shillong Lajong

Teams

Stadiums and locations

Personnel and sponsorship

Note: N/A- Not Announced

Head coaching changes

Transfers

Foreign players
Maximum 6 foreign players per team.
Indian Arrows cannot sign any foreign players as they are the All India Football Federation developmental team.

In bold: Players who are capped for there National Teams.

League table

Standings

Results 
Note: Matches after 14 March 2020 were cancelled due to the COVID-19 pandemic.

Season statistics

Scoring

Top scorers

Top Indian scorers

Top assists

Hat-tricks 

Result column shows goal tally of player's team first.

Cleansheets

Discipline

Player
 Most yellow cards: 5
  Gurjinder Kumar (Mohun Bagan)
  Charles Anandraj (Chennai City)
  Mohammed Irshad (Gokulam Kerala)
 Most red cards: 1
  Anwar Ali (Punjab)
  Andre Ettienne (Gokulam Kerala)
  Gurjinder Kumar (Mohun Bagan)
  Joseph Adjei (Aizawl)
  Mohamed Irshad (Gokulam Kerala)
  Zohib Islam Amiri (Gokulam Kerala)
  Mashoor Shereef (Chennai City)
  Radanfah Abu Bakr (Churchill Brothers)
  Marcos Jiménez Espada (East Bengal)
  Sandeep Singh (TRAU)
  Dhanachandra Singh (Mohun Bagan)

Club
 Most yellow cards: 24
 Punjab
 Most red card: 3
 Gokulam Kerala

Attendance

Note: Matches after 14 March 2020 were cancelled due to the COVID-19 pandemic.

Award

Hero of the Match 

Note: Matches after 14 March 2020 were cancelled due to the COVID-19 pandemic.

References 

 
I-League seasons
1
India
India